Al-Machriq (Arabic: The East) was a journal founded in 1898 by Jesuit and Chaldean priest Louis Cheikhô, published by Jesuit fathers of Saint Joseph University in Beirut, Lebanon. The subtitle was Revue Catholique Orientale. Sciences, Lettres, Arts. Cheikho edited Al Bashir in addition to Al Machriq. Al-Machriq played a significant role in reviving classical Arabic. It extensively dealt with the rapport between the Maronites and the Marada, two Christian groups living in the region. It had run through 72 volumes by 1998.

References

Bibliography
 R.B. Campbell: The Arabic Journal `al-Machriq'... under the editorship of Père L. Cheikho, University of Michigan, Ann Arbor, 1972.

1898 establishments in Ottoman Syria
1998 disestablishments in Lebanon
Arabic-language magazines
Catholicism in Beirut
Catholic magazines
Defunct magazines published in Lebanon
Jesuit publications
Lebanese Jesuits
Magazines established in 1898
Magazines disestablished in 1998
Magazines published in Beirut
Saint Joseph University